Mudbone is a recurring character in Richard Pryor's stand-up shows. Debuting on the 1975 album ...Is It Something I Said?, Mudbone is easily Pryor's most famous creation. A wino philosopher born in Tupelo, Mississippi, his character was an alter-ego for Pryor.

During Pryor's concert film, Richard Pryor: Live on the Sunset Strip, the audience begins to yell "Do Mudbone!" and Pryor reluctantly resurrects the character.

References

Comedy theatre characters
Fictional African-American people
Fictional philosophers
Male characters in theatre
Theatre characters introduced in 1975